The ATP Masters Series is part of the elite tour for professional tennis organised by the ATP called the ATP Tour.

The table below shows the 2007 ATP Masters Series schedule.

The tournaments in the ATP Masters Series were mandatory for the top players, but there is no ranking for Masters events only. Masters events count for more ranking points than International Series events, but fewer than Grand Slam events.

Results

Tournament details

Indian Wells

Singles 

Notes:
 Three-time winner Roger Federer lost to Guillermo Cañas in the second round after receiving a bye, ending a 41-match win streak. Cañas had originally been knocked out in qualifying by Alexander Waske, but due to an injury to one of the seeds he entered the main draw as a lucky loser. Cañas then lost his third-round match to Carlos Moyà.

Doubles 

Notes
 Bob Bryan and Mike Bryan, 2006 finalist, No. 2 seed and unbeaten for 12 games on the tour, lost in straight sets to the unseeded pair of Lindstedt (world No. 34) and Nieminen (world No. 73) in the first round.

Key Biscayne

Singles

Doubles

Monte Carlo

Singles

Doubles

Rome

Singles

Doubles

Hamburg

Singles

Doubles

Canada

Singles

Doubles

Cincinnati

Singles

Doubles

Madrid

Singles

Doubles

Paris

Singles

Doubles

Masters Cup

Singles

Doubles

Titles Champions

Singles

See also 
 ATP Tour Masters 1000
 2007 ATP Tour
 2007 WTA Tier I Series
 2007 WTA Tour

References

External links 
 Association of Tennis Professionals (ATP) official website

ATP Masters Series
ATP Tour Masters 1000
Atp Masters Series, 2007